The LHTEC T800 is a turboshaft engine for rotary wing applications. It is produced by the LHTEC (Light Helicopter Turbine Engine Company), a joint venture between Rolls-Royce and Honeywell. The commercial and export version is the CTS800. The engine was primarily developed for the United States Army's cancelled RAH-66 Comanche armed reconnaissance helicopter, but has found use in other applications.

Design and development

The engine was originally developed for the United States Army's LHX armed reconnaissance helicopter competition, competing against the Avco/Pratt & Whitney T800. The LHTEC T800 was selected to power the LHX in 1988. The Boeing-Sikorsky team was selected to build the  RAH-66 Comanche in 1991. A pair of T800-powered RAH-66 prototypes were constructed and underwent flight testing between 1996 and 2004. The LHX program was canceled in 2004, primarily due to cost overruns during its lengthy development, and the US Army's changing requirements.

Applications

 AgustaWestland Super Lynx 300 (CTS800-4N)
 AgustaWestland AW159 Wildcat (CTS800-4N)
 Ayres LM200 Loadmaster (LHTEC CTP800-4T) (aircraft not built)
 Boeing-Sikorsky RAH-66 Comanche (canceled)
 ShinMaywa US-2 (CTS800-4K) - boundary layer compressor drive
 Sikorsky X2 (T800-LHT-801)
 TAI/AgustaWestland T129 ATAK (CTS800-4A)
 TAI T625

Specifications (T800-LHT-801)

See also

References

External links

 Honeywell CTS800 page 
 Rolls-Royce CTS800 page

1980s turboshaft engines